Baranello is a comune (municipality) in the Province of Campobasso in the Italian region Molise, located about  southwest of Campobasso.  This town draws its name as a derivative of Monte Vairano which was a hilltop Samnite village and now is an archeological site.

Baranello borders the following municipalities: Busso, Colle d'Anchise, Spinete, Vinchiaturo.

People
Piero Niro, Italian composer and classical pianist, was born in Baranello.

References

External links
 Official website 

Cities and towns in Molise